Gibbon is the name of two fictional characters appearing in American comic books published by Marvel Comics.

Publication history
Created by Stan Lee and John Romita Sr., the Gibbon first appeared in The Amazing Spider-Man #110 (July 1972). The character subsequently appears in Amazing Spider-Man #111, The Spectacular Spider-Man #59-#60 (October–November 1981), #245-246 (April–May 1997), #252-253 (December 1997-January 1998), #256 (June 1998), She-Hulk #6 (May 2006), Punisher War Journal #4 (April 2007), #16 (April 2008), and Marvel Apes #1-4 (September–October 2008). The Gibbon received an entry in the All-New Official Handbook of the Marvel Universe A-Z #4 (2006)

Fictional character biography

Martin Blank
Martin Blank is a man who was seemingly born a mutant with an ape-like build and agility. Gibbon later joins a circus where he does well as an acrobat. Martin Blank begins his career as a friend of Spider-Man's while wearing a gibbon suit. He even wants to be his partner, but Spider-Man laughs at him. Sick of being seen as a freak, Martin cannot take further ridicule and lashes out. He then catches the eye of Kraven the Hunter, who enhances the Gibbon's powers with a herb broth, also giving him a great animal rage. Gibbon was defeated by Spider-Man.

Gibbon was one of the inmates at Ryker's Island. Gibbon sought revenge on Spider-Man, trying to prove himself as good as his foe. He is caught in the middle of a fight with Spider-Man and Beetle. Eventually, Gibbon helps Spider-Man by punching out the Beetle. Gibbon later joins up with other has-beens: Kangaroo, Grizzly, and Spot to form the Legion of Losers.

This team falls apart when Spider-Man carted Spot and Kangaroo to jail for bank robbery. He and Grizzly would later attempt to go hero, helping Spider-Man thwart a bank robbery by White Rabbit and eventually getting an action figure deal.

The Gibbon has been shown as retaining his physical mutation following M-Day, but showed no sign of his former mutant abilities.

Gibbon is seen as a client for the law offices that employ She-Hulk. He steals her tuna melt lunch out of the fridge.

Following the "Civil War" storyline, the Gibbon is a self-confessed loser at the wake of Stilt-Man that is held at the Bar With No Name. Almost all of the supervillains at the wake are the victims of murder/attempted murder. Disguised as a barman, Punisher poisons drinks and then blows up the bar. It is later mentioned that "they all had to get their stomachs pumped and be treated for third-degree burns".

Martin is being considered as a "potential recruit" for the Initiative program.

Martin, nearly hairless, has spent his time since the bar attack plotting vengeance on the Punisher against the wishes of Martin's wife Princess Python (who was apparently blinded in the explosion). When Martin finds the Punisher, however, he decides his revenge is not worth throwing away his life, and hands his gun over to the Punisher, returning home.

Gibbon returns as the lead character in the Marvel Apes storyline.The Gibbon wasn’t the perfect choice just because he’s a mainstream Marvel character who can easily "pass" in an ape-filled monkeyverse, but because he’s such a lovable loser. Nothing ever goes right for him—he never gets a break, the girl, or the glory—and suddenly he finds the fate of an entire universe in his hands. In some ways, Marvel Apes is a sprawling epic like Lord of the Rings, and the Gibbon is our Frodo— one small person dwarfed by the overwhelming forces that stand between him and his goal. He even has his own Samwise— a spunky gal-scientist (human) named Fiona Fitzhugh who literally gets sucked into this adventure along with him.

Gibbon, apparently restored to his simian appearance with the related abilities, is left with his personal life in shambles. His attempts to side with the heroes are frustrated by his ineptitude, and even Princess Python, previously a caring and loving wife, has now become fed up with the meek loser Gibbon is reverting to. Out of boredom and depression, he replies to an ad posted on the Daily Bugle by Fiona Fitzhugh, a spunky and cheery young scientist hoping to study the nature of superpowered individuals. Her experiments fling both of them into a reality populated by simian version of the Marvel Heroes, and destroy the machines that could have been used to bring Gibbon back. Fiona supposes, due to Gibbon having his powers since birth, instead of gaining them in puberty as the majority of the mutants (thus making Gibbon more similar to mutants like Multiple Man and Nightcrawler), and being "drawn" to that particular reality, that Gibbon may be connected somehow to the Simian World. While Fiona asks for help from the simian version of the Fantastic Four, Gibbon is inducted by Spider-Monkey into the Ape-Vengers. Despite their friendly facade, the Ape-Vengers are far more ruthless and bestial than their human counterparts. The Gibbon sets out to discover the truth, with the help of a cadre of dissident simian heroes: the Ape-Vengers are under the thrall of Baron Blood, who in this reality stole the appearance and the powers of Captain America, using his influence to prey over villains' and dissidents' blood at his leisure. Along with Speedball and Wolverine, despite being now pursued by Baron Blood and his followers, Gibbon manages to free Captain America from the iceberg in which he was entombed since the 1940s, gaining his help in battling the impersonator. Eventually, he and Fiona make their way back home.

Later while now resembling a man-sized Gibbon, he travels with Gorilla Girl, Fiona, and several other allies as Norman Osborn seeks to exploit the potential of the now somewhat-accessible 'ape' universe. Fiona works to provide the Gibbon with various means of disguise to hide his simian nature.

During the "Hunted" storyline, Gibbon is among the animal-themed superhumans that were captured by Taskmaster and Black Ant for Kraven the Hunter's Great Hunt that is sponsored by Arcade and his company Arcade Industries. Vulture spoke to Gibbon telling him not to ally with Spider-Man. Vulture turned against Gibbon as the Hunter-Bots move in on Gibbon. Gibbon was mortally wounded by a Hunter-Bot. As he laid dying, he reflected on his life while also coming to the conclusion that Princess Python never loved him. Spider-Man showed up and showed him some comfort by seeing to it that Gibbon did not die alone. Vulture lied to the other animal-themed characters that Gibbon sacrificed his life for them until Spider-Man showed up and mentioned what really happened to Gibbon.

Unnamed criminal
Martin Blank later sold his costume to Roderick Kingsley who gave it to an unnamed criminal. Gibbon was present with Hobgoblin (who was actually Roderick Kingsley's butler Claude) when he led his forces into fighting the Goblin King's Goblin Nation. After Hobgoblin was killed by Goblin King, Gibbon was among the villains that defected to the Goblin Nation.

Gibbon was seen with the other former Hobgoblin minions at the Bar with No Name where they encounter Electro.

Gibbon later appears as a member of the Hateful Hexad alongside Bearboarguy, Ox, Squid, Swarm, and White Rabbit. During the Hateful Hexad's disastrous fight against Spider-Man and Deadpool, the battle is crashed by Itsy Bitsy who stabs Gibbon.

Powers and abilities
Blank has a gibbon-like appearance, with superhuman strength, speed, agility, dexterity, reflexes, coordination, balance and endurance. He had previously worn a gibbon suit during his career.

Reception
 In 2020, CBR.com ranked Gibbon 10th in their "Spider-Man: 10 Weirdest Animal Villains From The Comics That We'd Like To See In The MCU" list.

References

External links
 Gibbon at Marvel.com
 Gibbon (Martin Blank) at Marvel Wiki
 Gibbon (Hobgoblin version) at Marvel Wiki
 Gibbon (Martin Blank) at Comic Vine
 

Characters created by John Romita Sr.
Characters created by Stan Lee
Comics characters introduced in 1972
Fictional acrobats
Fictional circus performers
Marvel Comics characters who can move at superhuman speeds
Marvel Comics characters with superhuman strength
Marvel Comics male supervillains
Marvel Comics mutants
Marvel Comics supervillains